Jia Yifan (born 29 June 1997) is a Chinese badminton player. She won gold medals at the 2017, 2021, 2022 World Championships, 2018 Asian Games and at the 2019 Asian Championships.

Achievements

Olympic Games 
Women's doubles

BWF World Championships 
Women's doubles

Asian Games 
Women's doubles

Asian Championships 
Women's doubles

BWF World Junior Championships 
Girls' doubles

Asian Junior Championships 
Girls' doubles

BWF World Tour (12 titles, 6 runners-up) 
The BWF World Tour, which was announced on 19 March 2017 and implemented in 2018, is a series of elite badminton tournaments sanctioned by the Badminton World Federation (BWF). The BWF World Tour is divided into levels of World Tour Finals, Super 1000, Super 750, Super 500, Super 300, and the BWF Tour Super 100.

Women's doubles

BWF Superseries (5 titles) 
The BWF Superseries, which was launched on 14 December 2006 and implemented in 2007, was a series of elite badminton tournaments, sanctioned by the Badminton World Federation (BWF). BWF Superseries levels were Superseries and Superseries Premier. A season of Superseries consisted of twelve tournaments around the world that had been introduced since 2011. Successful players were invited to the Superseries Finals, which were held at the end of each year.

Women's doubles

 Superseries Finals Tournament
 BWF Superseries Premier tournament
 BWF Superseries tournament

BWF Grand Prix (6 titles, 2 runners-up) 
The BWF Grand Prix had two levels, the Grand Prix and Grand Prix Gold. It was a series of badminton tournaments sanctioned by the Badminton World Federation (BWF) and played between 2007 and 2017.

Women's doubles

 BWF Grand Prix Gold tournament
 BWF Grand Prix tournament

BWF International Challenge/Series (2 titles, 1 runner-up) 
Women's doubles

Mixed doubles

 BWF International Challenge tournament
 BWF International Series tournament

Performance timeline

National team 
 Junior level

 Senior level

Individual competitions

Junior level 
Girls' doubles

Senior level

Women's doubles

Mixed doubles

References

External links 

1997 births
Living people
Badminton players from Tianjin
Chinese female badminton players
Badminton players at the 2020 Summer Olympics
Olympic badminton players of China
Olympic silver medalists for China
Olympic medalists in badminton
Medalists at the 2020 Summer Olympics
Badminton players at the 2018 Asian Games
Asian Games gold medalists for China
Asian Games silver medalists for China
Asian Games medalists in badminton
Medalists at the 2018 Asian Games
World No. 1 badminton players
21st-century Chinese women
20th-century Chinese women